Alfredo Guarini (1901–1981) was an Italian screenwriter, film producer and director. Guarini is noted in particular for his management of the career of the Italian actress Isa Miranda, who he eventually married. In the mid-1930s he was responsible for persuading her to work in a variety of different countries to build up a greater international profile after her breakthrough success in Everybody's Woman (1934).

Selected filmography

Director
 A Woman Has Fallen (1941)
 Document Z-3 (1942)
 Charley's Aunt (1943)

Producer
 Lady of Paradise (1934)
 Red Passport (1935)
 Germany Year Zero (1948)
 The Walls of Malapaga (1949)
 Journey to Italy (1954)
 Esterina (1959)
 Thor and the Amazon Women (1963)

References

Bibliography 
 Gundle, Stephen. Mussolini's Dream Factory: Film Stardom in Fascist Italy. Berghahn Books, 2013.

External links 
 

1901 births
1981 deaths
20th-century Italian screenwriters
Italian male screenwriters
Italian film producers
Italian film directors
Film people from Genoa
20th-century Italian male writers